Farshad Janfaza is an Iranian football forward who plays for Naft Masjed Soleyman in the Persian Gulf Pro League.

Iran

Club career
Janfaza started his career with Foolad from youth levels. He moved to Foolad Novin in 2014. He was a regular starter in promoting to Persian Gulf Pro League in 2015. In Summer 2015, He joined to Esteghlal Khuzestan.

Club career statistics

Honours

Club
Foolad Novin
 Azadegan League (1): 2014–15

Esteghlal Khuzestan
Iran Pro League (1): 2015–16
Iranian Super Cup runner-up: 2016

References

External links
 Fashad Janfaza at IranLeague.ir

1993 births
Living people
Iranian footballers
Esteghlal Khuzestan players
Sportspeople from Khuzestan province
Association football forwards
Naft Masjed Soleyman F.C. players